Sheridan Morais (born 11 March 1985) is a motorcycle racer from South Africa. He has competed in the Superbike World Championship, the Supersport World Championship, the FIM Superstock 1000 Cup and the Endurance FIM World Championship. He competed in the Asia Road Race SS600 Championship, aboard a Yamaha YZF-R6 and completed his first ever road race as a wildcard for the German Penz13.com team in Frohburg in September 2019, as the team was sitting out of the first round of the FIM Endurance World Championship 2019/2020 season. In the previous season Morais and the Penz13.com team finished 5th in the EWC without even competing in the final race in Suzuka.

Morais finished third in the 2022 Macau Grand Prix road race event, revived after the 2020 and 2021 events were cancelled due to COVID-19 restrictions.

Career statistics

Superbike World Championship

Races by year
(key) (Races in bold indicate pole position) (Races in italics indicate fastest lap)

Supersport World Championship

Races by year
(key) (Races in bold indicate pole position) (Races in italics indicate fastest lap)

Grand Prix motorcycle racing

By season

Races by year
(key) (Races in bold indicate pole position) (Races in italics indicate fastest lap)

References

External links

1985 births
Living people
South African motorcycle racers
Superbike World Championship riders
Supersport World Championship riders
Sportspeople from Johannesburg
FIM Superstock 1000 Cup riders
British Superbike Championship riders
Moto2 World Championship riders
South African people of Portuguese descent